Dornod Aymag FC is a Mongolian football club from Dornod, competing in the Mongolia Premier League.

References

Football clubs in Mongolia